The 2016 UWW World Wrestling Championships for non-Olympic weights were held from December 10 to 11 in SYMA Sports and Conference Centre, Budapest, Hungary.

Medal table

Medal summary

Men's freestyle

Men's Greco-Roman

Women's freestyle

Participating nations
142 competitors from 37 nations participated.

 (1)
 (4)
 (2)
 (6)
 (6)
 (6)
 (2)
 (5)
 (2)
 (2)
 (2)
 (1)
 (1)
 (4)
 (4) 
 (6)
 (1)
 (6)
 (6)
 (4)
 (6)
 (6)
 (4)
 (5)
 (4)
 (1)
 (6)
 (4)
 (6)
 (2)
 (2)
 (2)
 (1)
 (6)
 (6)
 (6)
 (4)

See also
Wrestling at the 2016 Summer Olympics

References 

Results Book

External links 
 UWW Official website

 
World Wrestling Championships
World Wrestling Championships
World Wrestling Championships
International wrestling competitions hosted by Hungary
International sports competitions in Budapest
December 2016 sports events in Europe